Leto is a goddess in Greek mythology.

Leto or LETO may also refer to:

As a name:
Leto (surname), a list of people so named
Leto (rapper), French rapper part of the French hip hop duo PSO Thug
Leto Atreides (disambiguation), three fictional characters in Frank Herbert's Dune universe
Leto (plant), a synonym of the genus Helogyne of the family Asteraceae
Leto (moth), a moth genus containing the single species Leto venus
Leto (film), a 2018 Russian film
Places
Leto, Florida, an unincorporated community
Leto Regio, a geological feature on Phoebe, a moon of Saturn
68 Leto, an asteroid

LETO:
Madrid-Torrejón Airport's ICAO code